The women's uneven bars competition at the 2006 Asian Games in Doha, Qatar was held on 3 and 5 December 2006 at the Aspire Hall 2.

Schedule
All times are Arabia Standard Time (UTC+03:00)

Results

Qualification

Final

 Cha Yong-hwa of North Korea originally won the bronze medal, but the International Gymnastics Federation took disciplinary action after discovering that Cha's passport had been modified and her age falsified. Her individual results since August 2006 have been nullified.

References

Results
Results

External links
Official website

Artistic Women uneven bars